Yonkers is an unincorporated community in Dodge County, in the U.S. state of Georgia.

History
The community's name may be a transfer from Yonkers, New York. A variant name was "Younker". A post office called Younker was established in 1890, and remained in operation until 1937.

The Georgia General Assembly incorporated the place as the "Town of Younker" in 1906. The town's municipal charter was repealed in 1909.

References

Former municipalities in Georgia (U.S. state)
Unincorporated communities in Georgia (U.S. state)
Unincorporated communities in Dodge County, Georgia